Los Angeles Air Route Traffic Control Center  is an air traffic control center located in Palmdale, California, United States. It is located at the northeast corner of 25th Street East and Avenue P adjacent to USAF Plant 42 and the LA/Palmdale Regional Airport.

The Los Angeles ARTCC is one of 22 Air Route Traffic Control Centers (ARTCC) operated by the United States Federal Aviation Administration. ARTCC controls en route air traffic over southern and central California, southern Nevada, southwestern Utah, western Arizona and portions of the Pacific Ocean Air Defense Identification Zone (ADIZ),
with the exception of military airspace and lower-level airspace controlled by local airport towers and TRACONs. Los Angeles Center is the 10th busiest ARTCC in the United States. Between January 1, 2017 and December 31, 2017, Los Angeles Center handled 2,255,026 aircraft operations.

Class B Airports (Major)
Las Vegas (LAS)
Los Angeles (LAX)
San Diego (SAN)

Class C, D, E, and G Airports
Apple Valley (APV)
Avalon / Catalina Island (AVX)
Bakersfield (BFL)
Banning (BNG)
Barstow / Daggett (DAG)
Blythe (BLH)
Bullhead City / Laughlin (IFP)
Burbank (BUR)
Calexico (CXL)
Camarillo (CMA)
Carlsbad / Oceanside (CRQ)
China Lake / Ridgecrest (NID)
Chino (CNO)
Compton (CPM)
Corona (AJO)
Delano (DLO)
Edwards / Rosamond (EDW)
El Cajon (SEE)
El Centro / Imperial (IPL)
El Centro (NJK)
El Monte (EMT)
Fullerton (FUL)
Hawthorne (HHR)
Hemet (HMT)
Henderson (HND)
Lancaster (WJF)
La Verne / Pomona (POC)
Lompoc (VBG)
Long Beach (LGB)
Los Alamitos (SLI)
Mojave (MHV)
Murietta / Temecula (F70)
North Las Vegas (VGT)
Oceanside (OKB)
Oceanside (NFG)
Ontario (ONT)
Oxnard (OXR)
Pacoima / Los Angeles (WHP)
Palmdale (PMD)
Palm Desert (UDD)
Palm Springs / Indio (PSP)
Point Mugu / Oxnard (NTD)
Ramona (RNM)
Redlands (REI)
Ridgecrest / Inyokern (IYK)
Riverside (RAL)
Riverside (RIV)
Salton City (SAS) 
San Bernardino (SBD)
San Clemente Island (NUC)
San Diego (MYF) 
San Diego (SDM)
San Diego (NKX)
San Diego / Coronado (NZY)
San Luis Obispo (SBP)
San Nicolas Island (NSI)
Santa Ana (SNA)
Santa Barbara (SBA)
Santa Maria (SMX)
Santa Monica (SMO)
Santa Paula (SZP)
St. George (SGU)
Shafter (MIT)
Tehachapi (TSP)
Thermal / Indio (TRM)
Torrance (TOA)
Twentynine Palms (TNP)
Twentynine Palms (NXP)
Upland (CCB)
Van Nuys / Los Angeles (VNY)
Victorville / Adelanto (VCV)
Visalia / Porterville (VIS)
Yuma (NYL)

See also
List of airports in the Los Angeles area

References

External links
Los Angeles Center Weather Service Unit (CWSU) (NWS/FAA)

Air traffic control centers
Air traffic control in the United States
Buildings and structures in Palmdale, California
WAAS reference stations
Aviation in California
Transportation in Palmdale, California